The Upper Midwest Athletic Conference men's basketball tournament is the annual conference basketball championship tournament for the NCAA Division III Upper Midwest Athletic Conference. The tournament has been held annually since 1999. It is a single-elimination tournament and seeding is based on regular season records.

The winner receives the UMAC's automatic bid to the NCAA Men's Division III Basketball Championship.

Results

Finals champion only
Championship game results incomplete, 1999–2009

Full results

Championship records
Results incomplete for 1999–2009

 Schools highlighted in pink are former members of the UMAC
 North Central (MN) and Northland have not yet qualified for the UMAC tournament finals

References

NCAA Division III men's basketball conference tournaments
Basketball Tournament, Men's
Recurring sporting events established in 1999